The Sunday Times is South Africa's biggest Sunday newspaper. Established in 1906, the Sunday Times is distributed all over South Africa and in neighbouring countries such as Lesotho, Botswana, and Eswatini.

History

The Sunday Times was first published on 4 February 1906 as a weekly, sister publication of the Rand Daily Mail which at the time was "standing alone" against its rival Transvaal Leader.

Founding editor George Herbert Kingswell introduced the slogan "A Paper for the People". It was later changed to "The Paper for the People", a slogan that is still in use today. For the first edition of the paper, published on 4 February 1906, 11,600 copies were printed and soon sold out, forcing the paper to print an additional 5000 copies. By November 1909 the paper sales had risen to 35,000.

In 1992, the former columnist Jani Allan sued the British broadcaster Channel 4 for libel over affair allegations involving her and Eugene Terre'Blanche. Allan had interviewed the AWB leader for the Sunday Times. Allan had already settled out of court with the London Evening Standard and Options magazine over similar allegations. The then-news editor of the newspaper, the late Marlene Burger and newspaper astrologer Linda Shaw testified against Allan. Prior to the libel suit, Allan had published articles for the newspaper dismissing the affair allegations. Allan also allowed the newspaper to publish answerphone messages left by Terre'Blanche as well as her threats of taking legal action against Terre'Blanche for nuisance contact. Allan lost the case; the judge ruled that she had not been defamed but did not conclude whether or not an affair had taken place. The case became notorious for violence and a dirty tricks campaign. Publications such as the Financial Mail and Allan herself speculated that the defence witnesses were paid by the De Klerk regime in an attempt to destabilise the far-right in South Africa. Shaw recounted her editor, Ken Owen's reaction to the case: "When I came back from London. Owen stood in the middle of the newsroom and said: 'You have single-handedly destroyed the reputation of every journalist in the country and we have become the laughing stock."

On 13 November 2005, the Sunday Times broke the story that the African National Congress (ANC) leader Jacob Zuma was being investigated on rape charges. It was reported that Zuma considered legal action against the publication, although it later emerged that an investigation was in fact under way. On 6 December 2005, official rape charges were filed against Zuma. He would later be acquitted of rape.

On 5 November 2007, it was reported that a consortium containing some senior government figures had launched a bid to purchase 100% of Avusa (previously Johncom), the company that owned the Sunday Times.

In March 2007, Zuma sued the paper for 6 million Rand over two columns by popular columnist David Bullard. The two columns, "Stupidity a mitigating circumstance for Zuma", published on 16 April 2006, and "Visit the Zuma website to see what was meant" (7 May 2006) were cited by Zuma as defamatory and an "impairment of his dignity". Although David Bullard was found to be operating within the ethical bounds of The Sunday Times regarding the two columns, he would later fall out of favour with Editor Mondli Makhanya.

On 10 April 2008, Bullard was fired from the Sunday Times after the publication of a column on 6 April 2008 (Uncolonised Africa wouldn't know what it was missing) received stern protest from several political parties. The editor apologised for the column, saying "by publishing him (Bullard) we were complicit in disseminating his Stone Age philosophies".

In September 2008, the Sunday Times was again vigorously attacked for publishing a highly controversial piece, this time in the form of a cartoon by critically acclaimed cartoonist Jonathon Shapiro (Zapiro). The cartoon depicted Jacob Zuma getting ready to rape the Justice System while being assisted by the leaders of various ANC and political factions and parties. Zapiro denied any ambiguity between Jacob Zuma's depiction as a rapist in the cartoon and his earlier rape trial. the Sunday Times and its editor were slated by various ANC officials. A joint press release by the ANC, the South African Communist Party and the ANC Youth League lambasted the Sunday Times editor, describing him as a dictator, and called for his replacement: "We can only hope that the newspaper will find a suitable leadership other than the ranting dictator who finds joy in manipulating the truth."

In 2015 the former editor of the newspaper, Tertius Myburgh was accused of being an apartheid-era spy. The allegations were made by the veteran journalist, John Matisonn in his book, God, Spies and Lies: Finding South Africa's Future Through its Past. In the same year, Jani Allan supported the allegations made against her former editor in an opinion piece published by the Daily Maverick.

Editors
1906–1909: Founding editor George Herbert Kingswell launched the Sunday Times and Rand Daily Mail for owner Sir Abe Bailey.
Kingswell was initially offered the job at The Rand Daily Mail (The Fourth Estate, Joel Mervis), but instead looked to create a weekly paper.

1909–1910: Lewis Rose Macleod named editor.

1910–1942: Joseph Langley Levy, a drama critic and leading cultural figure in Johannesburg, was born in Liverpool, England on 25 May 1887. He was editor of the Sunday Times for 32 years, during which circulation rose from 35,000 to 150,000, penetrating every province and reaching towns and villages scattered over an area of almost half-a-million square miles. He died in Johannesburg on 11 May 1945.

1942–1947: E.B ‘Chook’ Dawson -  remembered as the first of the paper's 'shirtsleeves editors', a journalist who hated ostentation in either people or prose. At the time of his death in 1957 he was also remembered as a hero of Delville Wood who saved a comrade's life during the epic battle in World War I.

1947–1958: N. A. G. Caley named editor

1959–1975: Joel Mervis has been credited as transforming the Sunday Times it into the most widely read and powerful weekly in South Africa during his tenure as editor.

1975–1990: Albert Tertius Myburgh (26 December 1936 – 2 December 1990) was a South African journalist and editor, best known as editor of the Sunday Times. Myburgh resigned as editor of the Sunday Times in September 1990 after 15 years. His next role was to be as ambassador to Washington or London. Four days later he was diagnosed with terminal cancer and died at home in December of the same year.

1991–1996: Ken Owen named editor.

1996–1998: Brian Pottinger was also the deputy chair of the South African National Editor's Forum during this time. He became the managing director of Times Newspapers Limited and in 2000 would be appointed at publisher of the Sunday Times. From 2003 to 2007 he was the chief executive officer of the Africa Division for Johnnic Communications Limited.

1998–2000: Mike Robertson was the editor and associate publisher for the Sunday Times during this period. He used to be the deputy editor, chief assistant editor, assistant editor and political correspondent for the newspaper. He is the publisher of the Sunday Times and managing director of Times Media Group's media operations.

2002–2003: Mathatha Tsedu was the deputy editor of the Sunday Independent, the deputy editor of the Star then the Deputy Chief executive of the SABC news, before becoming editor of the Sunday Times in 2002. In 2003 he was dismissed as editor of the Sunday Times. In 2014, the SA National Editors’ Forum announced Mathatha Tsedu would serve as its executive director.

2004–2010: Mondli Makhanya was appointed as editor of Sunday Times. A political writer and editor, he became the Mail & Guardian editor in 2002 before joining the Sunday Times in 2004. In 2010 Makhanya was promoted to Editor in Chief of Avusa Media newspapers (including The Times and Sowetan, Sunday World).

2010–2013: Ray Hartley was the founding editor of daily newspaper The Times in 2007, before taking over the reins as Editor of the Sunday Times in 2010 after Makhanya left. During Hartley's tenure as editor, Sunday Times journalists won virtually all the awards on offer, including the prestigious Standard Bank Sivukile and Taco Kuiper awards for investigative journalism. He is currently editor at large for the Times Media Group and launched the Rand Daily Mail website in 2014.

2013–2015: Phylicia Oppelt became the first female editor of the Sunday Times. Oppelt was the editor of the Daily Dispatch from 2005 to 2008, and as editor of Business Times from 2008 to 2010. In 2010, she was appointed editor of The Times, which had entered the market in June 2007 under Hartley's editorship.

2016–2020: Bongani Siqoko is the former editor of the award-winning Daily Dispatch, Saturday Dispatch and DispatchLIVE. He has been with the Daily Dispatch since November 2004, having held many positions at the newspaper — news editor, managing editor, and deputy editor — prior to his appointment as editor in June 2013. He holds an MA in International Journalism from City University London, United Kingdom.

2020 to present: S’thembiso Msomi became the new editor in the first quarter of 2020. Msomi has 24 years of journalism experience and was editor of the Sowetan for two years prior to his most recent appointment. Msomi returns to the Sunday Times as he was previously deputy editor. He also held the position of political editor of the Sunday Times and City Press. He is the author of the unauthorised biography of the previous DA leader, Mmusi Maimane.

Bibliography
 (Collection of Just Jani columns originally published in the Sunday Times.)
 (First edition of Out To Lunch columns originally published in the Sunday Times.)
 (Second edition of Out To Lunch columns originally published in the Sunday Times.)
 (Third edition of Out To Lunch columns originally published in the Sunday Times.)
 (Centenary special edition compilation)

Distribution areas

Distribution figures

Readership figures

See also
List of newspapers in South Africa
Sunday Times Literary Awards

References

The Fourth Estate, Joel Mervis, 1989
A Century of Sundays: 100 Years of Breaking News in the Sunday Times, 1906–2006

External links
Sunday Times Website
SAARF Website

Weekly newspapers published in South Africa
Mass media in Johannesburg
Publications established in 1906
Sunday Times (South Africa)
1906 establishments in South Africa
Online newspapers published in South Africa